Pleasant Plains is an unincorporated community and census-designated place (CDP) located in Franklin Township, in Somerset County, New Jersey, United States. As of the 2010 United States Census, the CDP's population was 922. Having no distinct boundaries, a large area in the center of Franklin Township centered on the intersections of South Middlebush Road (County Route 615) with Claremont and Suydam Roads (the former also CR 648) is generally considered Pleasant Plains.

History
Prior to the development of K. Hovnanian's Town and Country Estates in 1998, the area included little more than a collection of 18th and 19th century farms and rural lanes.  Its historic rural character may be seen in an estimate from 1882 which listed the Pleasant Plains population at 46.

An icon in the area has been the early 19th century general store and blacksmith shop buildings known since the late 1800s as Laird's Brothers Hardware and Laird's Corner Store.

Another area feature is the Pleasant Plains Cemetery on South Middlebush Road just south of Laird's Corner that has been in use from early settlement of the area until the present day.

Since the early 19th century (and possibly even earlier), the area featured a one-room schoolhouse known as the Pleasant Plains School.  Located on the north side of Suydam Road about a half mile west of Laird's Corner, it remained in use until about 1931 when the Township started decommissioning its one-room schoolhouses in favor of larger regional schools.  Moved across the road on log rollers, it was converted into a residence and used until the late 20th century when it was threatened with demolition to make way for the Town and County development.  Instead, it was moved to the Township's Municipal Complex on DeMott Lane where it awaits further rehabilitation.

The Six Mile Run Historic District listed on the New Jersey and National Register of Historic Places includes a number of properties in the Pleasant Plains area.

Geography
According to the United States Census Bureau, Pleasant Plains had a total area of 3.221 square miles (8.342 km2), including 3.215 square miles (8.328 km2) of land and 0.006 square miles (0.014 km2) of water (0.17%).

Demographics

Census 2010

Cemetery

The Pleasant Plains Cemetery, located on South Middlebush Road just south of Laird's Corner, was established in 1898.

References

Sources
 Brahms, William B. Franklin Township, Somerset County, NJ: A History, Franklin Township Public Library, 1998;

External links

Census-designated places in Somerset County, New Jersey
Franklin Township, Somerset County, New Jersey